Wilson Iván Altamirano (born 7 April 1998) is an Argentine professional footballer who plays as a midfielder for Argentine club Argentino Peñarol.

Career
Altamirano's senior career started with Belgrano, having been signed from Quilmes de Villa Allende. In 2017, Altamirano was loaned to Torneo Federal B club Las Palmas. Fifteen appearances followed. Back with Belgrano in 2018, Lucas Bernardi moved the midfielder into his first-team squad for the 2018–19 Argentine Primera División campaign, selecting him as an unused substitute in a league win over Estudiantes on 24 August. Altamirano made his professional debut two months later, on 22 October, during a 1–1 draw with Banfield.

In January 2022, Altamirano joined Argentino Peñarol.

Career statistics

References

1998 births
Living people
Argentine footballers
Sportspeople from Córdoba Province, Argentina
Association football midfielders
Club Atlético Belgrano footballers
Club Atlético Las Palmas players
Club Atlético Villa San Carlos footballers
Gimnasia y Esgrima de Jujuy footballers
Argentine Primera División players
Primera B Metropolitana players